Mary Apick (born  in Tehran) is an Iranian-born stage, television and film actress. She won the award for Best Actress at the 10th Moscow International Film Festival for her role in the 1977 film Dead End. She is of Iranian-Armenian ethnicity.

In the 1960s, Apick was in the first Iranian made television program titled Amir Arsalan alongside Parviz Sayyad.

In 2019, Apick stars in the movie Samir with Sprague Grayden, Michelle Lukes, and Peter Greene.

Filmography

References

External links

Interview with Mary Apick, Persian Mirror, 2004

1954 births
Living people
People from Tehran
Actresses from Tehran
Iranian film actresses
Iranian stage actresses
Ethnic Armenian actresses
Iranian television actresses
20th-century Iranian actresses
21st-century Iranian actresses
Iranian people of Armenian descent